This is a list of player transfers involving Top 14 teams before or during the 2018–19 season. The list is of deals that are confirmed and are either from or to a rugby union team in the Top 14 during the 2017–18 season. It is not unknown for confirmed deals to be cancelled at a later date. Perpignan and Grenoble are promoted to the Top 14, whilst both Brive and Oyonnax are relegated to the Pro D2 for the 2018-19 season.

Agen

Players In
 Romain Briatte from  Aurillac
 Xerom Civil from  Carcassonne
 Timilai Rokoduru from  Angoulême
 Adrian Motoc from  Racing 92
 Yohan Montes from  Castres
 Timilai Rokoduru from  Angoulême
 Leo Berdeu from  Lyon
 Andres Zafra from  Lyon
 Fouad Yaha from  Catalans Dragons
 Benito Masilevu from  Brive

Players Out
 Filipo Nakosi to  Toulon
 Antoine Erbani to  Pau
 Pierre Fouyssac to  Toulouse
 Vakhtang Akhobadze to  Biarritz
 George Tilsley to  Bordeaux
 Arthur Joly to  La Rochelle
 Corentine Braedin to  Montauban
 Loick Jammes to  Brive
 Jeremy Russell to  Albi
 Leandro Cedaro to  Mont-de-Marsan
 Lucas Tolot to  Nerac
 Florian Denos to  Ceret
 Ignacio Mieres to  Marmande
 Akapusi Qera to  Hartpury College

Bordeaux

Players In
 Beka Gorgadze from  Mont-de-Marsan
 Nicolas Plazy from  Colomiers
 Romain Buros from  Pau
 Lekso Kaulashvili from  La Rochelle
 Peceli Nacebe from  Fijian Drua
 Seta Tamanivalu from  Crusaders
 Semi Radradra from  Toulon
 Brock James from  La Rochelle
 George Tilsley from  Agen
 Eto Nabuli from  Queensland Reds
 Kane Douglas from  Queensland Reds
 UJ Seuteni from  Oyonnax
 Afa Amosa from  La Rochelle
 Laurent Delboubes from  Toulon
 Viliamu Afatia from  Racing 92
 Tevita Ratuva from  Brisbane City
 Mariano Galarza from  Gloucester

Players Out
 Sébastien Taofifénua to  Toulon
 Simon Hickey to  Edinburgh
 Johan Aliouat to  Biarritz
 Jean-Baptiste Poux retired
 Loann Goujon to  Lyon
 Hugh Chalmers to  Vannes
 Ed Fidow to  Provence
 Marc Clerc to  Castres
 Jayden Spence retired
 Apisai Naqalevu to  Clermont
 Metuisela Talebula to  Bayonne
 Tom Juniver to  Massy
 Ben Volavola to  Racing 92
 Pierre Gayraud to  Toulouse 
 Tian Schoeman to  Cheetahs
 Gauthier Doubrere to  Biarritz
 Fa'asiu Fuatai to  Bay of Plenty

Castres

Players In
 Yann David from  Toulouse
 Paea Fa'anunu from  Dax
 Wilfred Hounkpatin from  Rouen
 Martin Laveau from  Bayonne
 Tapu Falatea from  Narbonne  
 Kevin Gimeno from  Carcassonne
 Marc Clerc from  Bordeaux
 Scott Spedding from  Clermont
 Camille Gerondeau from  Clermont

Players Out
 Damien Tussac retired
 Kylan Jaminet to  Colomiers
 Yohan Montes to  Agen
 Eric Sione to  Perpignan
 Afusipa Taumoepeau to  Perpignan
 Pierre Berard to  Beziers
 Jordan Ladhuie to  Carcassonne
 Alexandre Bias retired
 Mihai Lazăr to  Grenoble

Clermont

Players In
 Tim Nanai-Williams from  Chiefs
 George Moala from  Blues
 Apisai Naqalevu from  Bordeaux

Players Out
 Raphaël Chaume to  Lyon
 Noa Nakaitaci to  Lyon
 Aurélien Rougerie retired
 Malietoa Hingano to  Stade Francais
 David Strettle to  Saracens
 Alexandre Nicoue to  Biarritz
 Aaron Jarvis to  Dragons
 Atila Septar to  Pau
 Scott Spedding to  Castres
 Otar Giorgadze to  Brive
 Camille Gerondeau to  Castres

Grenoble

Players In
 Clement Ancely from  Massy
 Steeve Blanc-Mappaz from  Vannes
 Junior Rasolea from  Edinburgh
 Taleta Tupuola from  Montauban
 Theo Nanette from  Aurillac
 Taiasina Tuifu'a from  Lyon
 Gaëtan Germain from  Brive
 Halani Aulika from  Sale Sharks
 Pablo Uberti from  Bordeaux
 Mike Tadjer from  Brive
 JC Janse van Rensburg from  Stormers
 Davit Kubriashvili from  Montpellier
 Raymond Rhule from  Stormers
 Ben Lucas from  Queensland Reds
 Mihai Lazăr from  Castres

Players Out
 David Mele to  Perpignan
 Aly Muldowney to  Bristol Bears
 Dylan Hayes to  Angoulême
 Eddie Sawailau to  Perpignan
 Benoit Jasmin to  Carcassonne
 Axel Paramelles to  Nevers
 Alaska Taufa to  Valence Romans Drome
 Paulin Mas to  Chambery
 Pierre Maïau to  Vannes
 Taiso Silafai-Leaana to  Valence Romans Drome
 Sona Taumalolo retired
 Arnaud Heguy to  Dax

La Rochelle

Players In
 Maxime Lafage from  Colomiers
 Ihaia West from  Hurricanes
 Arthur Joly from  Agen
 Brieuc Plessis Couillard from  Narbonne
 Marc Andreu from  Racing 92
 Remi Bourdeau from  Beziers
 Sila Puafisi from  Brive
 Lopeti Timani from  Melbourne Rebels

Players Out
 David Feao to  Narbonne
 Lekso Kaulashvili to  Bordeaux
 Brock James to  Bordeaux
 Jérémie Maurouard to  Lyon
 Afa Amosa to  Bordeaux
 Charles Bouldoire to  Biarritz
 Jason Eaton retired
 Luc Mousset to  Bayonne
 Gregory Lamboley retired
 Rene Ranger to  Northland

Lyon

Players In
 Raphaël Chaume from  Clermont
 Noa Nakaitaci from  Clermont
 Patrick Sobela from  Oyonnax
 Jean-Marc Doussain from  Toulouse
 Charlie Ngatai from  Chiefs
 Jérémie Maurouard from  La Rochelle
 Jonathan Wisniewski from  Toulon
 Loann Goujon from  Bordeaux
 Manuel Carizza from  Racing 92
 Badri Alkhazashvili from  Toulon

Players Out
 Stéphane Clément to  Stade Francais
 Frédéric Michalak retired
 David Attoub retired
 Mike Harris to  Toshiba Brave Lupus
 Tornike Mataradze to  Nevers
 Guram Papidze to  Nevers
 Tanginoa Halaifonua to  Massy
 Theophile Cotte to  Nevers
 Hemani Paea retired
 Leo Berdeu to  Agen
 Taiasina Tuifu'a to  Grenoble
 Andres Zafra to  Agen
 Theo Belan to  Toulouse
 Josh Bekhuis to  Honda Heat

Montpellier

Players In
 Johan Goosen from  Cheetahs
 Julien Le Devedec from  Brive
 Levan Chilachava from  Toulon
 Julien Tomas from  Pau

Players Out
 Julien Delannoy to  Pau
 Joffrey Michel to  Oyonnax
 Davit Kubriashvili to  Grenoble
 Jesse Mogg to  Pau
 Joe Tomane to  Leinster
 Charles Geli retired

Pau

Players In
 Julien Blanc from  Béziers
 Dan Malafosse from  Mont-de-Marsan
 Antoine Erbani from  Agen
 Julien Delannoy from  Montpellier
 Atila Septar from  Clermont
 Jesse Mogg from  Montpellier

Players Out
 Conrad Smith retired
 Romain Buros to  Bordeaux
 Sylvain Charlet to  Perpignan
 Julien Pierre retired
 Thomas Bianchin retired
 Brandon Fajardo to  Colomiers
 Masalosalo Tutaia to  Perpignan
 Julien Tomas to  Montpellier

Perpignan

Players In
 David Mele from  Grenoble
 Sylvain Charlet from  Pau
 Wandile Mjekevu from  Toulouse
 Johan van Heerden from  Baia Mare
 Eddie Sawailau from  Grenoble
 Eric Sione from  Castres
 Manu Leiataua from  Bayonne
 Masalosalo Tutaia from  Pau
 Eroni Sau from  Fijian Drua
 Cyril Deligny from  Narbonne
 Afusipa Taumoepeau from  Castres
 Paddy Jackson from  Ulster

Players Out
 Christophe Andre to  Provence
 Yann De Fauverge retired
 Joe Jones to  Sale Sharks
 Michael Faleafa to  Provence
 Jacques-Louis Potgieter retired
 Alasdair Strokosch retired
 Lifeimi Mafi retired
 Tevita Mailau retired
 Frederic Gendre to  Dijon
 Mathieu Majeau to  Dijon
 Jens Torfs to  Mont-de-Marsan
 Thibault Dufau to  Dijon
 Samuel Faconnier to  Ceret
 Martin Garcia Veiga to  FC Barcelona

Racing 92

Players In
 Finn Russell from  Glasgow Warriors
 Olivier Klemenczak from  Dax
 Simon Zebo from  Munster
 Fabien Sanconnie from  Brive
 Raphael Lagarde from  Bayonne
 Ben Volavola from  Bordeaux
 Dominic Bird from  Chiefs

Players Out
 Dan Carter to  Kobelco Steelers
 Remi Tales to  Mont-de-Marsan
 Adrian Motoc to  Agen
 Benjamin Dambielle retired
 Yannick Nyanga retired
 Marc Andreu to  La Rochelle
 Viliamu Afatia to  Bordeaux
 Albert Vulivuli to  Vannes
 Matt Worley to  Northampton Saints
 Patricio Albacete retired
 Casey Laulala retired
 So'otala Fa'aso'o to  Brive
 Manuel Carizza to  Lyon

Stade Français

Players In
 Kylan Hamdaoui from  Biarritz
 Lester Etien from  Massy
 Stéphane Clément from  Lyon
 Tala Gray from  Toulouse
 Malietoa Hingano from  Clermont
 Alex Arrate from  Biarritz
 Siegfried Fisiihoi from  Chiefs
 Nicolás Sánchez from  Jaguares
 Piet van Zyl from  London Irish
 Yoann Maestri from  Toulouse
 Gaël Fickou from  Toulouse
 Atunaisa Manu from  Viadana

Players Out
 Brandon Nansen to  Dragons
 Meyer Bosman retired
 Paul Williams retired
 Steevy Cerqueira to  Brive
 Sakaria Taulafo to  Ceret
 Zurab Zhvania to  Wasps
 Maxime Gau to  Massy
 Marvin Woki to  Montauban
 Bakary Meite to  Carcassonne
 Terry Bouhraoua to  France Sevens
 Marvin O'Connor to  France Sevens
 Jean Baptiste de Clercq to  Oloron

Toulon

Players In
 Filipo Nakosi from  Agen
 Rhys Webb from  Ospreys
 Sébastien Taofifénua from  Bordeaux
 Liam Messam from  Chiefs
 Stéphane Onambélé from  Colomiers
 Jacques Potgieter from  Munakata Sanix Blues
 Daniel Ikpefan from  Oyonnax
 Julian Savea from  Hurricanes
 Brian Alainu'uese from  Glasgow Warriors

Players Out
 Juan Martín Fernández Lobbe retired
 Edoardo Padovani to  Zebre
 Semi Radradra to  Bordeaux
 Jocelino Suta retired
 Laurent Delboubes to  Bordeaux
 Jonathan Wisniewski to  Lyon
 Vincent Clerc retired
 Bryan Habana retired
 Sebastian Tillous-Borde retired
 Levan Chilachava to  Montpellier
 Duane Vermeulen to  Kubota Spears
 Chris Ashton to  Sale Sharks
 Samu Manoa to  Cardiff Blues
 Alby Mathewson to  Munster (short-term deal)
 Ma'a Nonu to  Blues
 Badri Alkhazashvili to  Lyon

Toulouse

Players In
 Pierre Fouyssac from  Agen
 Alban Placines from  Biarritz
 Jerome Kaino from  Blues
 Pita Ahki from  Connacht
 Theo Belan from  Lyon
 Pierre Gayraud from  Bordeaux                       
 Maxime Mermoz from  Newcastle Falcons
 Pierre Pages from  Blagnac

Players Out
 Yann David to  Castres
 Jean-Marc Doussain to  Lyon
 Tala Gray to  Stade Francais
 Wandile Mjekevu to  Perpignan
 Florian Fritz retired
 David Roumieu retired
 Yoann Maestri to  Stade Francais
 Gaël Fickou to  Stade Francais
 Danie Mienie to  Lions
 Semi Kunatani to  Harlequins

See also
List of 2018–19 Premiership Rugby transfers
List of 2018–19 Pro14 transfers
List of 2018–19 Super Rugby transfers
List of 2018–19 RFU Championship transfers
List of 2018-19 Major League Rugby transfers

References

2018-19
2018–19 Top 14 season